Strobilanthes involucrata is a species of flowering plants in the family Acanthaceae and the tribe Ruellieae.  It is found in south-east Asia: native to Java and introduced to Indo-China. This was previously considered a species of the monotypic genus Pachystrobilus.

The Catalogue of Life accepted this species under its orthographic variant S. involucratus, with a subspecies S. i. tjibodensis, but this is not included in Plants of the World Online.

References

External links

Acanthaceae
Flora of Indo-China
Flora of Malesia
Lamiales of Asia